Maria Jamina Katherine Baltazar Agarao-Oloroso (Maria Jamina Katherine Baltazar Agarao) also known as Jam Agarao, Ate Jam is a Filipina nurse and politician and Member of the Philippine House of Representatives from Laguna's 4th District since 30 June 2022 and Member of the Laguna Provincial Board from the 4th District from 30 June 2019 to 30 June 2022.

Early life 
Born in Santa Cruz, Laguna, Philippines, Agarao is the daughter of former congressman of Laguna's 4th District, Benjamin Agarao Jr., and Estelita Agarao. She is the second of third children of Benjie Agarao.

Political life

Provincial Board Member (2019–2022) 
In 2019 elections Agarao ran for Member of the Laguna Provincial Board and won by 156,588 she serving with the son of former congressman of Laguna's 4th District and grandson of former Governor of Laguna Rai-Ann Agustine San Luis until 2022.

House of Representatives (2022–present) 
In 2022 elections Agarao run for congresswoman for Laguna's 4th District to succeed her father incumbent congressman Benjamin Agarao Jr. who was running for Mayor of Santa Cruz Agarao won 153,495 her opponent is former Mayor of Santa Maria Atty. Antonio "Tony" Carolino who got 153,267 the margin of the votes was 228. She is the youngest and first female Representative of 4th District of Laguna.

Electoral history

2019

2022

References 

Living people
Filipino nurses
Women members of the House of Representatives of the Philippines
Members of the House of Representatives of the Philippines from Laguna (province)
Year of birth missing (living people)
21st-century Filipino women politicians
Members of the Laguna Provincial Board